In enzymology, a 1-hydroxy-2-naphthoate 1,2-dioxygenase is an enzyme that catalyzes the chemical reaction

1-hydroxy-2-naphthoate + O2  (3Z)-4-(2-carboxyphenyl)-2-oxobut-3-enoate

Thus, the two substrates of this enzyme are 1-hydroxy-2-naphthoate and O2, whereas its product is (3Z)-4-(2-carboxyphenyl)-2-oxobut-3-enoate.

This enzyme participates in naphthalene and anthracene degradation.  It employs one cofactor, iron.

Nomenclature 

This enzyme belongs to the family of oxidoreductases, specifically those acting on single donors with O2 as oxidant and incorporation of two atoms of oxygen into the substrate (oxygenases). The oxygen incorporated need not be derived from O2.  The systematic name of this enzyme class is 1-hydroxy-2-naphthoate:oxygen 1,2-oxidoreductase (decyclizing). Other names in common use include 1-hydroxy-2-naphthoate dioxygenase, 1-hydroxy-2-naphthoate-degrading enzyme, and 1-hydroxy-2-naphthoic acid dioxygenase.

References 

 

EC 1.13.11
Iron enzymes
Enzymes of unknown structure